The American Helicopter Museum & Education Center (AHMEC) is located at 1220 American Boulevard, West Chester, Pennsylvania, United States. The transport museum focuses on the history, science and technology of rotary wing aviation. The collection contains over 40 civilian and military, autogyros, convertiplanes and helicopters, including some early generation models. The museum also has an extensive research library, the Renzo Pierpaoli Memorial Library, which contains documents, artifacts, films, and memoirs that museum members can use.

The museum strives to restore and display historic aircraft and chronicle the origin and development of rotary wing aircraft. The museum's exhibits chronicle the efforts of pioneers like Harold Frederick Pitcairn, Mr. W. Wallace Kellett of Kellett Autogiro, Arthur M. Young and Frank Piasecki, and today it continues to record the new and ever expanding role of the U.S. helicopter industry. The exhibits span the history of rotary wing aircraft from the earliest rotorcraft to the latest developments in tiltrotors, and AHMEC is one of only two museums in the world currently displaying a V-22 Osprey.

History
The American Helicopter Museum & Education Center opened to the public in October 1996. The museum was founded by Peter Wright, a veteran of the Flying Tigers, a founder of Keystone Helicopter Corporation, and sales manager of Helicopter Air Transport. In 2003, the Robinson Helicopter Company donated $1 million to the museum.

Programs
Each year the Museum hosts thousands of visitors, school groups, families and senior citizens. Tourists of all ages from the U.S and abroad come here to witness the history and the future of the helicopter.

Stubby, the educational traveling helicopter.
Stubby is an interactive helicopter that travels to schools, camps and community events. Docents accompanying Stubby give kids a chance to sit in the cockpit, operate the controls and learn how each works. Students also learn about the hand-eye co-ordination necessary to fly a helicopter. Stubby is a Hughes TH-55A Osage that has shortened rotor blades and tail boom to facilitate transport. It was acquired by the museum in 1998.

Women in Aerospace Technology Program
According to a brochure, the Women in Aerospace and Technology, Diversity Project engages young girls to look toward science and technology in fun and exciting ways and to mentor and encourage their future career and growth opportunities in technology.

It is a collaborative effort between the American Helicopter Museum & Education Center, the Girl Scouts of Eastern Pennsylvania, Boeing Rotorcraft Systems, Sikorsky Global Helicopters, the Physics Department at Penn State University, the Physics Departments at West Chester University, Drexel University, as well as other industry and educational partners.

The curriculum and guidelines are developed and taught by industry partners and stratified for appropriate age groups.  The project focuses and channels the interests of grade 4 to 12 girls in the areas of engineering, computer programming, aerospace technologies, math, and flight.  The initial focus of the program is four categories related to Aerospace: The Physics of Flight, Rotorcraft Design, Decreasing Size and Computerization of Controls, and Robotic Flight.

Aerospace Boot Camp
AeroCamp is a two-day aviation themed camp for kids ages 8–12. The museums has five separate camp sessions to choose from. Children learn the fundamentals of flight and aircraft design, build and fly their own gliders, pilot a flight in the museums flight simulator among other skills.

Ground School Boot Camp
Ground School Boot Camp is a one-week camp for students ages 12–17 which will serve as the beginning of their helicopter flight training. By the end of the week, each student will have accumulated 35 total hours of ground school from a certified flight instructor and will be logged and signed in their pilot logbook. Ground School Boot Camp is given classroom/lecture style which ground school is most commonly given, along with utilizing the museums exhibits and working helicopters for a hands-on experience and better understanding of lessons. Lessons include helicopter aerodynamics, airport operations, radio calls, weather, helicopter maneuvers, approaches and takeoffs, pilot certification process, navigation, aeronautical charts, and airspace, among others.

Aircraft on display

Notable Interior Displays
 Bell 47D-1 / H-13D Sioux 
 Bell TH-IL Huey.
 Boeing HH-47 CSAR-X (Mockup)
 Hughes MD 530F / MH-6J Little Bird.
 Hughes 369 (OH-6 / OH-6A) Cayuse.
 Piasecki PV-14 / HUP-2 Retriever.
Exterior Displays
 Kaman K-20 / HH-2D Seasprite.
 Piasecki H-21 / CH-21B Workhorse.
 Sikorsky S-61 / HH-3 Sea King.
 Sikorsky S-62 / HH-52 Sea Guardian 
 V-22 Osprey prototype on display as an example of a military tiltrotor.

See also
 Classic Rotors Museum, California, USA
 The Helicopter Museum, Somerset, England
 Hubschraubermuseum Bückeburg, Germany
 National Helicopter Museum, Connecticut, USA
 List of aerospace museums

References

Further reading

External links

 American Helicopter Museum & Education Center official website
 Photos of helicopters and rotorcraft at the American Helicopter Museum
 Rotorfest page at David Schultz Airshows
 Rotorfest at Helicopter Association International

Aerospace museums in Pennsylvania
Museums in Chester County, Pennsylvania
Museums established in 1996
Helicopter museums
Military and war museums in Pennsylvania
Air shows in the United States
Helicopters
West Goshen Township, Chester County, Pennsylvania
1996 establishments in Pennsylvania